Robert "Bob" Brown (born December 18, 1950) is a Canadian former professional ice hockey player who played in the World Hockey Association (WHA). He played parts of two WHA seasons for the Philadelphia Blazers, New York Raiders, New York Golden Blades and Jersey Knights. Brown was drafted in the sixth round of the 1970 NHL Amateur Draft by the Montreal Canadiens.

As a youth, Brown played in the 1963 Quebec International Pee-Wee Hockey Tournament with the Scarboro Lions minor ice hockey team.

Awards and honors

Career statistics

References

External links

1950 births
Boston University Terriers men's ice hockey players
Canadian ice hockey defencemen
Ice hockey people from Toronto
Living people
Montreal Canadiens draft picks
Jersey Knights players
New York Golden Blades players
New York Raiders players
Philadelphia Blazers players
NCAA men's ice hockey national champions
AHCA Division I men's ice hockey All-Americans